David Peel (born David Michael Rosario; August 3, 1942 – April 6, 2017) was a New York City–based musician who first recorded in the late 1960s with Harold Black, Billy Joe White, George Cori and Larry Adam performing as David Peel and The Lower East Side Band. His raw, acoustic "street rock" with lyrics about marijuana and "bad cops" appealed mostly to hippies and the disenfranchised.

Biography
Peel was born in Manhattan to Puerto Rican parents, Angel Perez, who worked in a restaurant, and Esther Rosario, a homemaker. He was raised in Brooklyn and served two years in the United States Army, and was stationed in Alaska.

Peel took his stage name from a  1967 hoax that claimed that banana peels were psychoactive.

In 1968, Peel was contracted by Elektra Records when he was first discovered and recorded two "envelope pushers" for the label. His album Have a Marijuana peaked at No. 186 on the Billboard chart.

Peel was rediscovered by John Lennon in 1971 as the early seventies continued its swing towards the youth revolution. Lennon befriended Peel when David was playing with his ragtag hippie band in New York's Washington Square Park in Greenwich Village. Lennon produced The Pope Smokes Dope for Peel. This album was banned in many countries and since has been sought after by collectors worldwide.

Peel appeared with John Lennon at the John Sinclair Freedom Rally in Ann Arbor, Michigan on December 10, 1971, later released as a documentary film called "Ten for Two". On January 23, 1972, Peel and his band performed live on the David Frost Show with Lennon, Yoko Ono and Jerry Rubin. This was Lennon's first live appearance on U.S. TV as a solo performer.

In 1976 the independent labels Orange Records and Auravox Records released An Evening With David Peel. The LP was hailed as being a breakthrough recording by capturing the tumultuous mid-1970s American underground movement as well as the bubbling under of live recordings that have become a mainstay of the recording arts. The mix was finalized by Ron St. Germain (of Band 311 fame) at Ultrasonic recording studios in Hempstead, New York.

Peel has been associated with the "transgressive, shock" performer GG Allin, with Allin's debut album and early singles released by Peel's Orange record label. Allin would cover Peel's "Devil's Prayer", "I Want to Kill You", and "I Like Marijuana", and frequently cited him as a musical influence in interviews. Peel also produced the album Always Was, Is and Always Shall Be, and in the unreleased song "What a drag it is to be dead" performed with GG Allin on the drums.

In the early-to-mid 1990's, Peel was a mainstay on The Howard Stern Radio program, singing at his yearly live birthday shows, and he wrote "the official" song when Stern attempted to run for Governor, the song titled (and the chorus stating) "Howard Stern for Governor," repeated three times and finishing with, "For Governor of New York." After Stern dropped out because of financial disclosure laws, Peel changed the "Stern" to "Pataki" for George Pataki since Stern was behind him. 

In 1995, the vinyl LP tracks from An Evening With David Peel were combined with two new multi-tracked studio recordings: "Junk Rock" and "I Hate You" (recorded at Right Track Studios, NYC) for a CD release Up Against The Wall. In the additional studio recordings on the CD, Muruga Booker (of Genesis fame) played his "electric talking drum" on the comeback hit "Junk Rock".

Still in 1995, Technohead produces "I Wanna Be a Hippy", a gabber remix of "I Like Marijuana", which quickly climbed the charts in many countries.

In 2011, Peel signed with Global Recording Artists. The David Peel Anthology, a career retrospective compiled by Peel with his favorite tracks from his entire career, was released in 2012.  In 2011 through 2013, Peel was involved in the Occupy Wall Street protests at Zuccotti Park, in Union Square, and in other New-York-area locations. In addition to performing, Peel documented the protests via hundreds of photographs, some of which he released online. In 2013, David Peel and the Protesters released Up Against the Wall Street, an album of themed protest songs. In 2015, Peel was back to his fight for the legalization of marijuana, releasing his latest album as David Peel and the Lower East Side titled Give Hemp a Chance.

He also made film music for the avant-garde director Rosa von Praunheim.

On March 31, 2017 Peel was escorted to the Veterans Administration hospital in Manhattan New York by fellow musician Joff Wilson, after complaining that he was not feeling well. He suffered a series of three heart attacks upon his arrival. Peel died at the hospital on April 6, 2017. was buried with full military honors at Calverton National Cemetery Wading River New York Section 53 Grave 3208 on April 17, 2017.

Discography

 1968: Have a Marijuana
 1970: The American Revolution
 1972: The Pope Smokes Dope
 1974: Santa Claus Rooftop Junkie
 1976: An Evening with David Peel
 1977: Bring Back the Beatles
 1978: King of Punk
 1979: "Junk Rock / I Hate You" (45 rpm single released under David Peel and Death)
 1980: Death to Disco
 1980: John Lennon for President
 1982: Animal In Love
 1984: 1984
 1986: Search to Destroy
 1987: John Lennon Forever
 1987: World War III
 1993: Anarchy in New York City
 1994: Battle for New York
 1994: War and Anarchy
 1995: Noiseville
 1995: Up Against the Wall
 2002: Legalize Marijuana
 2002: Long Live the Grateful Dead
 2002: Rock 'n' Roll Outlaw
 2004: Jirokichi Live at Koenji
 2008: Marijuana Christmas
 2012: Anthology
 2013: Up Against the Wall Street
 2015: Give Hemp A Chance

Film

Peel has appeared as himself in various films, including Please Stand By (1972), Rude Awakening (1989), High Times' Potluck (2004) and The U.S. vs. John Lennon (2006).

In Jack Milton's film Please Stand By, Peel portrays and stars as a media hippie revolutionary, who hijacks a network television van and jams the airwaves with unauthorized radical broadcasts to the nation.

See also
 Counterculture
 Vietnam War
 Danny Says

References

External links

1942 births
2017 deaths
Musicians from New York City
Apple Records artists
American punk rock musicians
Freak scene musicians
Yippies
Protopunk musicians
Place of birth missing
Cannabis music
Elektra Records artists